Eschatothrips is a genus of thrips in the family Phlaeothripidae.

Species
 Eschatothrips barythripoides
 Eschatothrips cerinus
 Eschatothrips decoratus
 Eschatothrips pachyurus
 Eschatothrips reticulotubus
 Eschatothrips variegatus
 Eschatothrips whitcombi

References

Phlaeothripidae
Thrips
Thrips genera